The vice president of Armenia was a political position in the government of Armenia created in 1991. The position was abolished by the constitution of 1995 which took effect in February 1996.

Officeholders

References

Politics of Armenia
Government of Armenia
Armenia
Titles held only by one person